Poi E is an album released by New Zealand Māori culture group the Pātea Māori Club. In 1984 the totally Māori language title track "Poi E" topped the New Zealand pop charts for four consecutive weeks, and was that year's biggest selling single - outselling all international recording artists.

Dalvanius Prime, the album's producer and leader, was known for merging the styles of traditional Maori show bands and more recent Maori hip-hop.  
 
Later, in the early 1990s, Poi E was produced as a Māori musical with additional songs, and in 2000, selections were performed in Sydney, at the Waitangi Day Concert

Track listing
"E Pa To Hau" featuring Hohepa Malcolm (1:02)
"Ko Aotea" (0:53)
"Taranaki Patere-Kahuri" (2:59)
"Parihaka-Tewhiti-Tohu-Tawhiao" (4:13)
"Nga Ohaki" (2:21)
"Ngakau Maru" (2:59)
"Hei Konei Rā" (3:13)
"Ngoi Ngoi" (4:25)
"He Tangata Tini Hanga" (2:28)
"E Papa Waiari" (4:15)
"Aku Raukura" (4:01)
"Poi E" (3:51)
"Haeremai" featuring Cara Pewhairangi (2:52)
"Kua Makona" (2:51)
"Paikea" (2:19)
"Anei Ra Overture & Aria" (5:27)

References

External links
 Original music video for the title track "Poi E"
 nzhistory.net.nz entry and video
 Interview with Syd and Hui Kahu from Patea Maori Club Info and audio
 Original artwork for album cover in the collection of the Museum of New Zealand Te Papa Tongarewa

Hip hop albums by New Zealand artists
Dalvanius Prime albums
1987 albums
Māori-language albums
Patea